As I Lay Dying is an American metalcore band from San Diego, California. Founded in 2000 by vocalist Tim Lambesis, the band's first full lineup (including Lambesis' Point of Recognition bandmate Jordan Mancino) was completed in 2001. The band has released seven albums, one split album, and two compilation albums.

As I Lay Dying's fourth studio album An Ocean Between Us peaked at No. 8 on the Billboard 200, and No. 1 on the Top Rock chart. The band has performed at events such as Wacken Open Air, With Full Force, Soundwave Festival, Warped Tour, Bloodstock Open Air and Taste of Chaos. In 2007, As I Lay Dying won the "Ultimate Metal God" award from MTV2 at the first annual "All That Rocks" special; was named "Artist of the Year" at the San Diego Music Awards in 2005, 2007 and 2008; and was nominated for a 2008 Grammy Award for the song "Nothing Left." Their fifth studio album The Powerless Rise was written over a three-year period, and was released in May 2010 to widespread critical acclaim. Their last studio album before their hiatus, Awakened, was released on September 25, 2012.

The band went on an indefinite hiatus in 2014 when Lambesis was convicted and sentenced to six years in prison for soliciting the murder of his estranged wife. The remaining members formed Wovenwar with vocalist Shane Blay.

In 2018, Lambesis reunited with Hipa, Sgrosso, Mancino and Gilbert. On June 8, 2018, the band released the song "My Own Grave", their first recording in six years. They released their seventh studio album, Shaped by Fire, on September 20, 2019. The band's lineup would crumble in the years following the album's release; Hipa departed the band in 2020, followed by Gilbert and Mancino in 2022, just over a month between each other.

History

Formation and first releases (2000–2004)
After leaving the band Society's Finest, in which he played guitar, vocalist Tim Lambesis formed As I Lay Dying in 2000. Starting out as a duet with drummer Jordan Mancino, they first met as a band in February 2001. They both were in the hardcore punk band Point of Recognition. The band's name came from the novel of the same name by William Faulkner that was published in 1930; although the band's lyrics and music are not directly inspired by the novel.

Shortly after the band's formation, Pluto Records offered As I Lay Dying a recording contract and, after accepting the offer, the band entered the studio one month later to record their first album Beneath the Encasing of Ashes, released in June 2001. The band then recorded five songs for a split album, again through Pluto Records, with San Diego post-hardcore band American Tragedy.

As I Lay Dying realized it needed to expand to a five-piece band to include another guitarist and a bassist. Mancino commented "we started going on tour and we needed obviously more people than that." As Lambesis and Mancino were the only permanent members, the band recruited friends to perform with them and subsequently underwent several lineup changes: bassist Noah Chase departed in 2001, while Brandon Hays, and his subsequent replacement Aaron Kennedy, departed in 2003. During early 2003, when As I Lay Dying's Pluto Records contract expired, the band pursued deals with other record labels. After extensive touring and an increase in popularity, As I Lay Dying was offered a record deal with Metal Blade Records in March 2003.

In July 2003, the band's second studio album Frail Words Collapse was released. Produced by Lambesis, the album peaked at No. 30 on Billboards Independent Albums chart and No. 41 on the Top Heatseekers chart. William York of Allmusic thought the band "doesn't really add anything new to the mix from a musical standpoint" with the release, while also praising it for being "solid enough and well executed" with "adequate" production. Sherwin Frias of Jesus Freak Hideout had similar sentiments and commented "As I Lay Dying didn't exactly break many boundaries in making this record", but praised that each song is "executed so well (and with such precision) that nary a song misses its target." Touring then occurred to promote the album, with support from bands Himsa, Shadows Fall, The Black Dahlia Murder, Killswitch Engage, In Flames, Sworn Enemy, and Hatebreed. Music videos for the songs "94 Hours" and "Forever" received rotation on networks such as Fuse and MTV2's Headbangers Ball.

Success (2005–2009) 
As I Lay Dying entered Big Fish recording studio in Encinitas, California, US in January 2005 to record their third studio album. Shadows Are Security was released in June of the same year and debuted at No. 1 on the Independent Albums chart. It was also the band's first release to enter the Billboard 200—at No. 35—and sold about 275,000 copies. Wade Kergan of AllMusic called it "one of the strongest releases of 2005," and commented that new guitarists Phil Sgrosso and Nick Hipa make the band "stronger." Rod Smith of Decibel Magazine commented: "Tim Lambesis's finely honed roar in bittersweet instrumental matrices augmented by occasional clean vocals by bass guitarist Clint Norris. Guitarists Phil Sgrosso and Nick Hipa whip up a melodic cyclone on 'The Darkest Nights'." By this time, guitarist Evan White had quit the band for personal reasons after his mother died. All the singing was done by Dave Arthur of Kings to You, because it sounded more powerful in the studio in comparison to Clint Norris's singing.

As I Lay Dying began touring to promote the new record by making appearances at Hell on Earth, Winter Headline Tour, and Ozzfest, as well as a tour with Slipknot and Unearth. The band was on the second stage alongside Rob Zombie, Killswitch Engage, Mastodon, The Haunted, and It Dies Today. The band raised its profile in 2006 through its support slot on the Taste of Chaos tour in the US, alongside bands such as Deftones, Thrice, Dredg, Funeral for a Friend, and Story of the Year. In May 2006, Beneath the Encasing of Ashes and the songs from the split album were re-released through Metal Blade Records as A Long March: The First Recordings. The album contained the original and re-recorded versions of the songs from the split album—the band preferred to re-release the material, as they didn't want their fans paying large sums of money to listen to early releases. The re-release peaked at No. 3 on the Independent Albums chart and No. 129 on the Billboard 200 chart. In mid-2006, As I Lay Dying was the headline act at the Sounds of the Underground Festival.

Norris left the band on good terms in November 2006 with a desire to focus on his marriage. The band auditioned ten bassists, but none proved successful. Lambesis received demo tapes from a band called This Endearing, of which bassist Josh Gilbert was a member; however, Lambesis chose to "sit on it" and waited for the band to record more material. This Endearing subsequently disbanded and Gilbert was recruited as As I Lay Dying's new bass guitarist.

In 2007 As I Lay Dying started recording a new album titled An Ocean Between Us, which was released on August 21, 2007. Debuting at No. 8 on the Billboard 200 and No. 1 on the Top Rock chart, with first-week sales of 39,000 units, the album was the highest-charting release for the band.

Co-produced by Killswitch Engage guitarist Adam Dutkiewicz and As I Lay Dying, and mixed by Colin Richardson, the album received generally positive reviews. Christa L. Titus of Billboard commented: "Whatever the differences between As I Lay Dying's personal desires and what its fans demand, this album surely acts as a bridge," praising the song "Comfort Betrays" for its guitar solo. Scott Alisoglu of Blabbermouth.net described the album as "a well-rounded and often thrashy metalcore album, as the band has struck an effective balance between aggression and accessible melodies." Thom Jurek of Allmusic praised the band for expanding its musical range by including melodic singing and choruses, as they had previously done on "Confined" from Shadows Are Security. It was the first time that bass guitarist Gilbert recorded a studio album with the band.

To promote the album, As I Lay Dying performed at the Warped Tour 2007 in August, and toured through Europe in September with Darkest Hour, Himsa, and Maroon. The band was awarded the title "Ultimate Metal God" by MTV2's "All That Rocks" special, and was nominated for a Grammy Award in the category of "Best Metal Performance" for the song "Nothing Left". The other Grammy Award nominees included winner Slayer, King Diamond, Machine Head, and Shadows Fall. The band played a portion of the 2008 Warped Tour, as well as the Taste of Chaos UK 2008 Tour with headliners Atreyu.

On April 9, 2009, the DVD This Is Who We Are was released in Europe, and was released in the US on April 14, 2009. The DVD was certified Gold in the US almost a month after its release.

The Powerless Rise and Decas (2010–2011)
After recording through 2009, the band's fifth record The Powerless Rise was streamed on the MySpace Music website on May 7, 2010, up until May 10, 2010. The album was officially released on May 11, 2010, and received generally positive critical acclaim, with one critic saying: "Fans of metalcore in general, and As I Lay Dying in particular, will be more than satisfied with The Powerless Rise, as the band's gradual progression and consistency makes this their best album."

In 2010 the band toured in support of The Powerless Rise, headlining the majority of their shows. In the first half of the year, the band embarked on a US tour with Demon Hunter, blessthefall, and War of Ages. This was followed by a mid-2010 headlining tour titled "The Cool Tour" across the US, and a headlining tour across US/Canada that also featured All That Remains, Unearth, and Carnifex. The band's final headline tour of the year was in Europe, with Heaven Shall Burn, Suicide Silence, and Sylosis.

In February 2011, the band headlined a US tour with support from Winds of Plague and After the Burial. The band then toured in late April/early May with Trivium, in support of Disturbed, on the "Music as a Weapon" tour in Australia and New Zealand. Then at the end of May and beginning of June, the band headlined a few performances with Heaven Shall Burn.

On November 8, 2011, As I Lay Dying released a compilation, Decas, in honor of the band's ten-year anniversary. The album featured three new, original songs; four cover versions of songs by bands such as Slayer, Judas Priest and Descendents; a re-recorded medley that uses parts of several songs taken from Beneath the Encasing of Ashes; and four remixes, consisting of one song from each of their albums since Frail Words Collapse. The album's first track "Paralyzed" was released as a lyric video on September 13, 2011, and as a free download on iTunes on November 7, the day before the album's release. The band embarked on the "A Decade of Destruction" tour, coinciding with the release of the album, from November to December 2011.

Awakened, Tim Lambesis' trial and hiatus (2012–2016) 
On January 25, 2012, an announcement revealed that the band would be playing the Mayhem Festival of 2012 with Slipknot, Slayer, Motörhead, Anthrax, The Devil Wears Prada, Asking Alexandria, Whitechapel, Upon A Burning Body, I, the Breather, Betraying the Martyrs, and Dirtfedd. The band announced in April 2012 that Bill Stevenson, who had previously worked with NOFX and Rise Against, would be the producer for their sixth album.

On June 22, 2012, the band announced that their sixth album would be titled Awakened and the first single "Cauterize" was released on June 25, 2012. On September 12, 2012, As I Lay Dying released their second single "A Greater Foundation" with a corresponding music video. The album was released on September 25, 2012, and "Cauterize" was available on the band's website as a free download for a 24-hour period. As I Lay Dying won the "Metal Band of the Year" award from Loudwire in 2012, beating other well-known bands, including Anthrax and Lamb of God. Subsequently, prior to his criminal charges, Lambesis started a new band entitled Pyrithion with guitarist Ryan Glisan, formerly of Allegaeon. They released one EP as a band.

On May 7, 2013, Lambesis was arrested in Oceanside, California, US after hiring an undercover detective to kill his estranged wife. The report was made by the San Diego County Sheriff's Department, leaving the future of the band uncertain. On the following day, the band released a statement in which they said: "The legal process is taking its course and we have no more information than you do. There are many unanswered questions, and the situation will become clearer in the coming days and weeks. We'll keep you informed as best we can." They also stated that their thoughts were "with Tim, his family, and with everyone else affected by this terrible situation." Eight days later, the band cancelled their mid-2013 tour with Killswitch Engage, stating that "we feel that it is best for the band to be off the road while the current situation gets sorted". During the month of his initial arrest, Lambesis pleaded "not guilty" and his lawyer stated: "His thought processes were devastatingly affected by his steroid use." On February 25, 2014, Lambesis changed his plea from "not guilty" to "guilty" and consequently faced a potential sentence of nine years in prison.

Rather than continue on without Lambesis, Mancino, along with former members Phil Sgrosso, Nick Hipa, and Josh Gilbert, decided to focus on a different style of music under a different band name, Wovenwar, with Shane Blay as the vocalist, This project took shape long before Lambesis' plea. although Mancino still remained a member of As I Lay Dying. During this period of time, Lambesis was also working on music and found time to release the third Austrian Death Machine album, titled Triple Brutal.

On May 16, 2014, Lambesis was sentenced to six years in prison, with 48 days credit for time served.

Lambesis' release, reunion and new music (2016–2018)
Lambesis was released from prison on probation in December 2016. After his release he began reaching out to the other members of the band looking to apologize in person starting with Mancino and Gilbert. After months of silence Gilbert and Mancino eventually met with Lambesis and began speaking with him regularly after noting positive changes in his character. Lambesis attempted to reconnect with Sgrosso and Hipa following his meetings with Gilbert and Mancino—who as a result of Lambesis' actions and the strain it put on their relationships—had stopped speaking to each other following the recording of the second Wovenwar album. Sgrosso explained in a reunion-related discussion video posted by the band on June 16, 2018, that he initially replied to all of Lambesis' emails with explicit expressions of having no desire to speak with him. Sgrosso explained that his disdain with Lambesis started well before his arrest and took relief in not having to be in a band with him anymore upon Lambesis' arrest. His relationship with Hipa deteriorated due to what both described as not being able to deal with the weight of the aftermath properly. Hipa explained that while he initially felt empathy towards Lambesis after his tearful courtroom apology—it was short lived following Lambesis' interview with Alternative Press which Hipa claimed read like "one long excuse". After Lambesis made his public apology, Sgrosso finally agreed to meet with Lambesis and claimed Lambesis evolved into a different person than he was for the years leading up to his arrest which inspired him to reach out to Hipa to rekindle their friendship. Hipa was the last to speak with Lambesis due to what Hipa described as not being able to escape the shadow of Lambesis' arrest and the mental and physical effects it took on him. After reconnecting with Sgrosso and reading Lambesis' apology—he agreed to meet with Lambesis as a means to "let go of his hatred" and claimed that Lambesis owned up and took responsibility for every one of his actions he was called on.

Over the course of the tail end of Lambesis' incarceration and release, the band's public opinion towards Lambesis softened. Mancino did an interview primarily discussing Wovenwar, but also spoke about As I Lay Dying on MetalSucks' podcast. He stated that, contrary to popular beliefs, that Hipa, Sgrosso and Gilbert are still technically a part of As I Lay Dying due to their record contract and in another interview stated that he has "no ill will" towards Lambesis and wished him well. Hipa, when on an episode of Jamey Jasta's podcast when asked about a reunion commented "what it comes down to is what makes sense with what we have going on in our lives. And we've got a lot of important things going on that don't relate to that and we've made commitments to, and that's what we are honoring at this moment. Honestly it's just not something we try and consume our thoughts with. Because it's like we have families, businesses, professions, and a band—and all these things we're super invested into. It's like all of our attention is there with that at the moment."

On September 2, 2017, Metal Injection reported that Lambesis was working on new music and planned to release it under the As I Lay Dying name and that none of the pre-hiatus lineup aside from Lambesis would be returning. This would later be proven false, as on June 8, 2018, the band released the music video for "My Own Grave", confirming through the video that the lineup of Lambesis, Hipa, Sgrosso, Gilbert and Mancino had reunited. They performed their first show—which sold out in four minutes—in five years at the SOMA Sidestage in their hometown of San Diego. The band has stated the single was their first and only song written since their formal reunion in February 2018 and had no concrete plans past releasing the single and playing the SOMA show.

The news of their reunion drew particularly divisive reactions from fans and media outlets. While fan and critical reception of the band's reunion and comeback single were met largely with praise, others were openly skeptical on supporting Tim Lambesis following his prison sentence. Most notably was MetalSucks, who published an editorial that they will no longer be writing about the band with multiple outlets voicing their support for MetalSucks' decision. On June 16, 2018—the date of their comeback show at the SOMA—the band published a video on their official YouTube account addressing the questions and criticisms fans and critics of the band had and explaining the terms in detail of the reunion.

In July 2018, the band announced their first European headlining tour for December 2018. A day later, they announced their North American tour for November 2018. A vast majority of the shows sold out immediately. While tickets sold out quickly, some venues and festivals received a public backlash for booking the band because of Lambesis' crimes and decided to cancel the band's performances. Spain's Resurrection Fest announced it would be dropping As I Lay Dying from its bill in October 2018, and months later in January 2019, the Memphis, Tennessee venue Growlers cancelled their previously scheduled show in April 2019. Growlers released a statement that acknowledged Lambesis' public message from 2018, but stated: "After hearing the combined voice of disheartened friends, local bands, and patrons, locally owned concert venue and bar, Growlers, has cancelled their scheduled show with As I Lay Dying, previously set for April 5th, and will replace it with a local show to benefit victims of domestic violence [...] Not everyone was ready to give Lambesis a second chance, and Growlers has created controversy in Memphis for booking his band."

Touring, Shaped by Fire, and lineup changes (2019–present)
They embarked on a tour in March 2019 with Phinehas, Currents and Frost Koffin as support. On April 12, 2019, the band released a music video for "Redefined", including a guest appearance by August Burns Red frontman Jake Luhrs. On April 14, the band announced the "Shaped by Fire" tour of Europe with support from Chelsea Grin, Unearth and Fit for a King running from September 2019 and concluding in October. On July 15, the band announced the North American dates of the "Shaped by Fire" Tour with direct support from After the Burial and Emmure to begin on November 15 at the House of Blues in Las Vegas and conclude on December 14 with a hometown show at the Soma San Diego. Details of their forthcoming album, Shaped by Fire, were leaked through Nuclear Blast's European website with a projected release date of September 20, 2019. On August 9, the band officially announced their first album in seven years, Shaped by Fire, would be released through Nuclear Blast Records, along with releasing the album's title track. On September 13, the band released "Blinded" as the album's fourth single along with an accompanying music video.

In March 2020, as a way of supporting their crew during the COVID-19 pandemic, they released an additional song, "Destruction or Strength", a B-side from Shaped by Fire album sessions. In May 2020, another music video for the song "Torn Between" was released.

On August 15, it was reported that Nick Hipa might have left the band, as he no longer performed with them and disassociated his personal social media accounts with the band. Hipa officially confirmed his departure one year later on August 31, 2021, noting that behaviors resulting from being in the band led to his decision to leave it: "There is tremendous good that can be accomplished through singular focus on the power of music. However to my memory and recent experience, it comes at the cost of tolerating behavior which at times mistreats, disrespects, and hurts other people." He further elaborated that the power and reasoning behind As I Lay Dying's reunion had faded in favor of superficial pursuits, which he did not wish to be a part of.

On September 24, 2021, the band unveiled a new single, "Roots Below".

On May 16, 2022, it was announced that bassist and clean vocalist Josh Gilbert left the band after 15 years. The band announced Ryan Neff from Miss May I would play bass on their upcoming tour. Around the same time, it was announced Unearth guitarist Ken Susi would play guitar on the band's upcoming tour as a replacement for Hipa. Susi would later leave Unearth and join As I Lay Dying as a full-time member, as announced on March 3, 2023. On June 9, 2022, drummer Jordan Mancino announced he will be sitting out of the band's upcoming tour dates due to "a number of ongoing internal issues that have not yet been resolved". Drummer Nick Pierce, also formerly of Unearth, was announced as the band's live drummer for their upcoming tour. A week later, the band claimed Mancino "ex-communicated himself from the band" and that moving forward without him "was the only option", implying he was no longer in the band.

After finishing their European tour in summer 2022, Tim Lambesis announced the band had plans to release an album in 2023.

Musical style and influences

As I Lay Dying is considered a prominent metalcore band. The band also has been referred to as Christian metal, death metal, and thrash metal. As I Lay Dying's music uses lots of elements of melodic death metal. In a review of Beneath the Encasing of Ashes, Bradley Torreano of AllMusic described the band's sound as a blend of heavy metal, hardcore, and grindcore. Heavy metal writer Garry Sharpe-Young described the band as a "Christian Hardcore act employing the Grind edged vocals of singer Tim Lambesis and a distinct hint of Scandinavian guitar chug." As I Lay Dying's influences include In Flames, Living Sacrifice, Iron Maiden, Slayer, At the Gates, Pantera, Megadeth, Fear Factory, Cannibal Corpse, Thin Lizzy, Shai Hulud, Dark Tranquillity, Metallica, Judas Priest, and Earth Crisis.

Christianity
Although As I Lay Dying has stated on numerous occasions that all of the members of the group are practicing Christians, the band is usually described by media as being in the metalcore genre, not Christian metal. The band's lyrics do not focus on Christian themes the way many praise music bands do, nor do they treat their music as a direct extension of their private Christian worship or proselytizing efforts. For example, not once do the names God or Jesus appear in any As I Lay Dying song, nor do any of their songs explicitly invoke Christian doctrine or quote the Bible. Most songs tend to address broader spiritual concepts like existential angst or the struggle between reason and spirituality.

Lyricist and lead singer Tim Lambesis has given mixed commentary on the subject: asked in 2008 if the members were "a Christian band" or "Christians in a band", Lambesis stated on the band's FAQ, "I'm not sure what the difference is between five Christians playing in a band and a Christian band, if you truly believe something, then it should affect every area of your life. All five of us are Christians. I believe that change should start with me first, and as a result, our lyrics do not come across very 'preachy.' Many of our songs are about life, struggles, mistakes, relationships and other issues that don't fit entirely in the spiritual category. However, all of these topics are written about through my perspective as a Christian." Furthermore, during an August 2010 radio interview on the Christian metal radio show The Full Armor of God Broadcast, Lambesis stated "I can only really write about what I'm passionate about in life, so naturally my faith, my belief in the teachings of Jesus and His resurrection come across in our lyrics."

However, in later years, Lambesis showed an increasing philosophical skepticism towards Christianity and religion in general. Court documents stated Lambesis emailed his wife Meggan in August 2012, while on tour with As I Lay Dying, asking for a divorce and stating he "no longer believed in God". In explaining some of the lyrics from Awakened, Lambesis stated on his personal Tumblr account that his studies of theology had led him to the conclusion that "tradition and truth are often at odds with each other", and while he "didn't hate all religious belief", he was finding it "very difficult for [him] to outline exactly who it is that's worth siding with." He also quoted the book Pagan Christianity by George Barna and Frank Viola, claiming that both "Protestant and Catholic denominations have poisonous roots". While on house arrest in July 2013, after being charged with soliciting his wife's murder, Lambesis published a blog post in which he obliquely confirmed his previous loss of faith in Christianity. In 2014, Lambesis said that although they were marketed as a Christian band, the members privately considered themselves atheists. Following this statement, guitarist Nick Hipa responded by calling these claims slanderous and defamatory. However, since his arrest it has been reported that Lambesis, in an April 2014 statement by the band, "[...] has spent much of the last year reevaluating what originally convinced him to abandon belief in God. After much brokenness and repentance he sees things differently, considers himself a follower of Jesus, someone submitted to the will of God, or whatever you want to call it. That's for him to talk about when he's comfortable and only time will tell if he is sincere."

Members 

Current
 Tim Lambesis – lead vocals (2000–2014, 2017–present)
 Phil Sgrosso – guitar, backing vocals (2003–2014, 2018–present)
 Ken Susi – guitar (2022–present)
 Ryan Neff  – bass guitar, clean vocals  (2022–present) 
 Nick Pierce – drums (2022–present)

Former
 Jordan Mancino – drums (2000–2014, 2018–2022)
 Evan White – guitar (2001–2003), bass (2002–2003)
 Jeremy Rojas – guitar (2001)
 Noah Chase – bass (2001, 2002, 2003)
 Tommy Garcia –  guitar, bass, backing vocals (2002–2003; session member 2003–2010)
 Brandon Hays – bass, guitar (2002–2003)
 Jasun Krebs – guitar (2002–2003) 
 Aaron Kennedy – bass (2003)
 Nick Hipa – guitar, backing vocals (2003–2014, 2018–2020)
 Clint Norris – bass, clean vocals (2003–2006)
 Josh Gilbert – bass, clean vocals (2006–2014, 2018–2022)

Touring musicians
 Chad Ackerman – guitar (2001–2002), backing vocals (session, 2007)
 Chris Lindstrom – guitar (2001, 2003)
 Ruben Gutierrez – guitar (2001)
 Caylen Denuccio – bass (2002–2003)
 Mark Macdonald – guitar (2003–2004)
 David Arthur – clean vocals (2005)
 Duane Reed – backing vocals (2007)
 Justin Foley – drums (2009)
 Joey Bradford – backing vocals (2012)
 Brandon Morales – guitar, backing vocals (2022)
 Alex Lopez – drums (2022)

Timeline

Discography

 Beneath the Encasing of Ashes (2001)
 Frail Words Collapse (2003)
 Shadows Are Security (2005)
 An Ocean Between Us (2007)
 The Powerless Rise (2010)
 Awakened (2012)
 Shaped by Fire (2019)

Awards and nominations
 San Diego Music Awards
 Artist of the Year (2005)
 Artist of the Year (2007) 
 Artist of the Year (2008)
 Best Hard Rock (2011)
 Grammy Awards
 Nominated for 2008 Best Metal Performance for the song "Nothing Left"
MTV2 Music Awards
 Ultimate Metal God (2007)
 Hollywood Film Fest awards
 Best Music Video for "The Sound of Truth" music video
 Loudwire Music Awards
 Metal Band of the Year (2012)

References

External links

2000 establishments in California
Metalcore musical groups from California
Articles which contain graphical timelines
Heavy metal musical groups from California
Musical groups established in 2000
Musical groups disestablished in 2014
Musical groups from San Diego
Musical groups reestablished in 2017
Musical quintets
Nuclear Blast artists